Dassault Systèmes DELMIA is a Global Industrial Operations software that specializes in digital manufacturing and manufacturing simulation.

The acronym DELMIA means: Digital Enterprise Lean Manufacturing Interactive Application

History
January 2000 - Dassault Systèmes forms DELMIA as a brand for digital manufacturing and production solutions. It was formed after the acquisition and consolidation of Deneb Robotics, EAI-Delta, and Safework by Dassault Systèmes.
April 2003 – DELMIA receives honors from the State of Michigan and Oakland County for its contribution to the county and state.
November 2003 – DELMIA is profiled on CNN news channel as a winner in the network’s “Champions of Industry” award series.
September 2005 - DELMIA wins the Automation Alley “Technology Company of the Year” award.
April 2007 - Frost & Sullivan selects Dassault Systèmes and DELMIA as the recipient of the 2007 Company of the Year Award within the North American product life-cycle management (PLM) solutions space.
May 2008 – Release of Version 6 DELMIA to create, share, execute and optimize virtual production systems.
May 2009 - DELMIA was recognized as an Automotive News PACE (Premiere Automotive Suppliers’ Contribution to Excellence) Award Winner.
June 2010 - DELMIA Human models Teo and Sia get an upgrade and become lifelike with the Dassault Systèmes Version 6 2011 release.
June 2010 – DELMIA introduces a video series called, “The Robot Whisperers” 
March 2011 - Dassault Systèmes acquires Intercim LLC. Intercim is now known as DELMIA Operations.
July 2013 - The Dassault Systèmes Apriso acquisition is completed. Apriso will be integrated into the DELMIA application portfolio and virtual plus reality capabilities.

References

External links

Delmia fact sheet

Product lifecycle management